Perspectives is a current British television arts documentary series for ITV. The show began airing on 24 April 2011 and aired its fifth series in 2015.

Format
Each hour long programme sees well-known celebrities (who have included Ian McKellen, David Walliams, Sheila Hancock and Paul O'Grady) travel to various parts of the world to explore more about a person who has inspired them. They're not all people, some can be books such as Griff Rhys Jones whose chosen subject was the novel The Wind in the Willows.

Episodes

Series 1
The first series of the show was announced on 31 March 2011 and began airing on 24 April 2011, starting with Ian McKellen: Looking for Lowry.

Series 2

Series 3

Series 4
A fourth series of Perspectives was announced on 13 February 2014 and began airing on 20 April 2014, starting with Alan Davies: The Magic of Houdini.

Series 5
A fifth series of Perspectives began airing on 19 April 2015 starting with: "Michael Jackson's Thriller with Ashley Banjo"

Series 6
Series 6 began airing on 18 October 2016.

References

External links
Perspectives at the Internet Movie Database

2011 British television series debuts
British television documentaries
ITV documentaries
English-language television shows
Television series by ITV Studios